Sakussaare is a village in Haljala Parish, Lääne-Viru County, in northeastern Estonia. It is just south of Vosupere, with one main road through it the 176 which is a one way road.

References

 

Villages in Lääne-Viru County
Kreis Wierland